

Lago Grande de Monte Alegre is a floodplain lake located in the state of Pará, municipality  Monte Alegre, Northern Brazil, Mesorregião do Baixo Amazonas, Microrregião de Santarém, 1,400 km north of the country's federal capital Brasília. Estimates of the area occupied by the lake vary between 300 sq km (Loureiro & Loureiro 1987) and 576 sq km (Vieira & Hartmann 1989). Both of these values may be correct, depending on the time of the year measurements were taken.

References 

Lakes of Brazil